Twisto is the brand name under which buses and trams are operated in the Norman city of Caen. The CTAC (Compagnie des Transports de l'Agglomération Caenaise) owns the buses and has been operating services under the Twisto brand since 2002. Its bus depots are in Mondeville and the Industrial estate of Hérouville-Saint-Clair. Twisto formerly operated the Caen Guided Light Transit from 2002 to 2017, before it was replaced by trams.

External links
Official website (fr.)

Bus companies of France

1977 establishments in France